MV Abegweit were icebreaking railway, vehicle, and passenger ferries which operated across the Abegweit Passage of Northumberland Strait, connecting Borden-Carleton, Prince Edward Island to Cape Tormentine, New Brunswick. There were two vessels named Abegweit that serviced this route between 1947 and 1997.

The word Abegweit is derived from the Mi'kmaq word for Prince Edward Island, Epekwit'k, meaning "cradled (or cradle) on the waves."

Design and construction
In the late 1970s, Canadian National Railway (CN) underwent a corporate reorganization which saw all of its ferry services placed under a subsidiary named CN Marine.  CN Marine began the process of planning the design with German & Milne for a replacement of  MV Abegweit, a vessel which entered service in 1947.

The new vessel was to be named MV Straitway and unlike MV Abegweit, was designed as a RoRo ferry which permitted faster loading and unloading.  She was also custom designed for the protected waters of Northumberland Strait.  This permitted German & Milne to depart from traditional vessel design by eliminating the need for a conventional hull and bow.

The new vessel was laid down as hull 1136 at Saint John Shipbuilding & Dry Dock in Saint John, New Brunswick and was launched on 20 February 1982.

Naming controversy
While the new vessel was still in the midst of construction in late 1981, it was decided that the name MV Straitway would be changed to MV Abegweit, the same name as the vessel soon to leave service. Since the new vessel would be taking the same name, it was necessary to rename the original vessel for its last months of service. The name chosen for the original MV Abegweit was MV Abby and she was discarded when the new MV Abegweit entered service in 1982. A curious phenomenon arising out of CN Marine's name-switch operation is that many in the general public assume the new vessel's name was "Abegweit II" - this is not the case as she was officially registered as MV Abegweit.

During the winter of 1982–1983, while the new MV Abegweit was in service between Borden and Tormentine, the old MV Abby was docked at Pictou, Nova Scotia and advertised for sale by CN Marine. She was purchased by the Columbia Yacht Club in Chicago, Illinois who were not permitted by city ordinances to construct a clubhouse on the waterfront, therefore the club decided to purchase MV Abby and permanently moor her at their facility. The vessel left the Northumberland Strait for good in April 1983 and remains in "service" in Chicago.

CN Marine service
The new MV Abegweit was a much larger and more capable vessel - the largest on the Northumberland Strait service and she became the flagship of this route.  Measuring 401 feet (122 m) in length and displacing 12,000 tons, the ship had six main engines which generated 18,000 brake horsepower (13 MW) which drove two stern propellers and two bow thrusters and one stern thruster.  She could carry 974 passengers and 250 cars (or 40 trucks or 20 railway cars) and had a hoistable car deck which doubled the number of cars on the B/C decks.

Marine Atlantic service
In 1986, the federal government reorganized its east coast ferry services and changed the name of the Crown corporation from CN Marine to Marine Atlantic.  On 31 December 1989 MV Abegweit'''s sister icebreaking ferry MV John Hamilton Gray carried the last railway cars off Prince Edward Island with the abandonment of CN service on the island (see Prince Edward Island Railway).

In 1986, discussion of a "fixed link" to replace the Borden-Cape Tormentine ferry service was revived. An 18 January 1988 plebiscite in Prince Edward Island gave 60% approval for design and construction of such a structure. On 31 May 1997 the Confederation Bridge was opened and the ferry service closed.

Sale and disposal
MV Abegweit was used as a cargo vessel to haul Marine Atlantic equipment located at Borden and Cape Tormentine to the corporation's dock and storage facilities at North Sydney, Nova Scotia to be used on its Cabot Strait service.

MV Abegweit then laid up at the Sydport Industrial Park at Point Edward, Nova Scotia on the west shore of Sydney Harbour and was placed for sale. Due to her relatively young age, Marine Atlantic had considered retrofitting MV Abegweit with a hurricane bow and to lengthen to use her on the Cabot Strait service but the cost estimates for such modifications proved too costly, therefore she was declared surplus.  MV Abegweit languished for two years without moving at Sydport before being sold in July 1999 to a firm named "Accrued Investments Inc." in Houston, Texas.  MV Abegweit was renamed MV Accrued Mariner and sailed to the port of Galveston, Texas that month.

The new owners were supposedly examining the possibility of using MV Accrued Mariner as a freight/railway ferry in the Great Lakes or possibly in the Gulf of Mexico but she was never used and languished in Galveston until February 2004.  During this time she was again advertised for sale on eBay with a price of US$6 million at one point.

She was sold in January 2004 to a company named "Pelican Marine" in India.  Her name was changed to MV Mariner under the registered owner of "Bridgend Shipping Ltd." in Kingstown, St. Vincent. The vessel sailed from Galveston at the end of February 2004 under the operation and management of "Jupiter Shipmanagement" (India). To burn off the fuel still onboard from her days at Marine Atlantic, some of which was topped off by Accrued Investments, the ship was operated at reduced speed on two engines. Mariner'' crossed the Atlantic Ocean, Mediterranean Sea, Suez Canal, Red Sea, and Indian Ocean arriving at the Alang Shipbreaking Yards in Alang, India in early May 2004.

The Lloyd's Registry shows her as being scrapped on 9 May 2004.

See also
 MV Abegweit (1947)
 CN Marine
 Marine Atlantic

References

External links
 The Island Register.com - P.E.I.'s Coastal Vessels and Ferries
 Miramar Ship Index - Abegweit

Ferries of Prince Edward Island
Ferries of New Brunswick
Icebreakers of Canada
CN Marine
Marine Atlantic
1982 ships
Ships built in New Brunswick
Transport in Prince County, Prince Edward Island